Jammu and Kashmir State Road Transport Corporation was the agency of the Government of Jammu and Kashmir that provides road transport within Jammu and Kashmir and the adjacent states.

History

With the closure of Kohla Bridge in 1947, most of the trucks and buses owned by Allied  Chirag Din and Sons, Nanda Bus Service, N.D. Radhakrishan and other small transport operators got held  up on the other side of the border. The foremost challenge that the State of Jammu and Kashmir faced was the availability of essential commodities. The handful of private transporters did not come forward to meet the challenge. Their vehicles had to be commandeered to bring refugees from border areas but they did not co-operate with the State’s Emergency Administration. The non co-operating transporters were even jailed.  
The Government addressed the issue of development of road  transport immediately after assuming office which led to the birth of the first-ever Government owned transport fleet on June, Ist 1948. A handful of persons were drawn virtually from the road-side both at Jammu and Srinagar to form the management to operate the 50 trucks it acquired from General Motor Corporation, Bombay along with some accessories left by the American Company.
The Organisation was run as a government department in the early stages. Later it was named as Government Transport Undertaking. The  J&K State Road Transport Corporation (a successor to the erstwhile Government Transport Undertaking) came into existence on 1.9.1976 under Road Transport Corporation Act of  1950. 

The J&K SRTC has played a vital role in developing the economy of the State right from the date of its inception. The JKSRTC has maintained the supply of essential commodities to every nook and corner of the State very efficiently and operates passenger bus services in all the regions within the State. It also operates services on Inter-state routes in Punjab, Haryana, Himachal Pradesh, Uttar Pradesh, Delhi and Rajasthan.

Objectives

The main objectives of the Road Transport in the Public Sector in J&K State are summarized as under:

1. To make the transport system advantageous and convenient to the Public, kargil, Tourism, Trade, Industry and various other agencies.

2. To provide an efficient and economic Road Transport Service for the traveling public both within the State and on the Interstate routes.

3. To provide for highly integrated transport system for carriage of essential commodities of the Government agencies and under the Public Distribution System.

Fleet

At present the Corporation has total 373 buses.  On operational fleet of State Road Transport Corporation and measures to prevent the state owned corporation from bankruptcy, the government stated that there are 278 buses of JKSRTC operating on different routes of the state.

References

Jammu and Kashmir (state)
Transport in Jammu and Kashmir
State road transport corporations of India
Transport companies established in 1948
Government agencies established in 1948
Indian companies established in 1948
Indian companies disestablished in 2019